Advanced Fighting Fantasy (AFF) is a British roleplaying game based on the Fighting Fantasy and Sorcery! gamebooks, first published in 1989. Just as the gamebooks, AFF is set in the world of Titan. A second edition of AFF was published in 2011.

AFF is chiefly meant to facilitate the games master to write his or her own adventures inspired by Fighting Fantasy. The few adventures published for the game are brand new adventures specifically written for the system as opposed to converting existing gamebook stories for multiplayer RPG usage.

AFF is unrelated to both the Myriador d20 conversions of several gamebooks by Jamie Wallis, and the electronic conversions of the Sorcery! series by inkle. Both of these feature unique rules not seen elsewhere in the Fighting Fantasy brand.

The game mechanics 

The rules of AFF are adapted from the rules of the Fighting Fantasy gamebooks and was an expanded but separate follow-up to Fighting Fantasy – The Introductory Role-Playing Game. This system is based on skills, here called "Special Skills". The game features neither classes nor levels.

A player character, called Hero, is defined by:
 four characteristics: Skill, Stamina, Luck, Magic; they range from 7 to 12 except for Stamina which ranges 14-24;
 race: Human, Dwarf, Elf;
 a set of special skills: Combat, Movement, Stealth, Knowledge and Magical special skills; special skill values usually range from 0 to 4;
 a few Talents, which are special features such as Animalfriend, Natural Mage, Robust, Weaponmaster...
 a Social Class, from 0 (beggar, criminal) to 10 (king).
The creation of a Hero starts with the choice of a "concept", e.g. a Knight of Salamonis or a Student from the magical school of Yore — this has no influence on the attributes and is more a background guideline. Unlike the gamebooks, the characteristics and special skills are not rolled but are bought with creation points. The rules provide archetypes which allow a fast creation: Adventurer, Archer, Barbarian, Priest of Telak, Rogue, Warrior, Wizard...

There are three types of tests:
 unopposed test: a roll of two six-sided dice (2d6) must be less than the sum of a characteristic (usually Skill, sometimes Magic) and a special skill; this is an extension of the Skill tests of the gamebooks;
 opposed tests: each character roll 2d6 and adds Skill and a special skill, the highest wins; this is an extension of the combat procedure of the gamebooks;
 Luck test: same as the gamebooks rule.
The rules provide difficulty adjustments for given situations (e.g. -5 to the Climbing special skill when wearing a plate armour).

The combat rules are the same as the gamebooks', except that the points of damage (Stamina loss) are determined randomly: the attacker rolls 1d6 and reads the points of damage on a table (one for each weapon), the defender does the same to apply the damage reduction from his armour. There are a few combat options: Luck test to increase or reduce the damages, surprise, feint...

A spellcaster must have a least 1 in the Magic characteristic and one point in one special skill: Magic-Minor, Magic-Priestly, Magic-Sorcery or Magic-Wizardry. There are three types of magic:
 Minor magic: the Cantrips are easy-to-cast spells with limited effects;
 Religion: each god bestows his priests three general powers (the same three for all his priests) and one specific power;
 Sorcery: this type of magic was created in the Old World, and does not draw its energy from the surrounding environment but from the sorcerer's own Stamina, and from material components; this is the adaptation of the magic system of the Sorcery! gamebooks;
 Wizardry: the Wizard studied in a school to learn to use the invisible arcane power that permeates the world of Titan.

The Advanced Fighting Fantasy system (original publication)

Advanced Fighting Fantasy titles published by Arion Games (2011-present) 

The main change brought by this edition is the addition of the Sorcery! magic system. Arion Games also brought in several titles not previously directly related to AFF (as opposed to FF in general) under the Advanced Fighting Fantasy brand.

For Out of the Pit, Arion added the statistics needed to make that monster book compatible with AFF rules. The spells in the Sorcery! spell book were likewise given additional mechanics to make them AFF spells. Other publications, such as the Titan worldbook, was republished as-is (with no system specific info).

Translations 

They added original material: the core book has a 100 pages additional campaign, Le Tambour de Gondrim (The Drum of Gondrim), and original illustrations. They also created a gamemaster's screen with an original adventure, and paper figurines, floorplans and tiles.

 
  Gamemaster's screen and an adventure,  Pirates à la dérive (Adrift Pirates), first part of the campaign Maudit Trésor... (Wicked Treasure...).
  Tiles and paper figurines.
  A2 vinyl colour map of Allansia, from the original material from Jonathan Green, Steve Jackson and Ian Livingstone.
  Free downloadable adventure, first part of the campaign Les Larmes de Hmurresh (The Tears of Hmurresh).
  Free downloadable adventure in a contemporary world (see the original version).

Scriptarium started a call for crowdfunding to publish the translation of Titan in March 2014. The success of the subscription allowed the execution of new original illustrations (by John Sibbick, Malcolm Barter, Bill Houston, and maps by Steve Luxton), illustrated cards for the magic spells (playing cards format), a miniature representing Yaztromo, and an A2-format colour map of Titan showing the location of the adventures (gamebooks and romans). It also contains an original 90 p. campaign, À la Recherche de la jeunesse perdue (In Search of Lost Youth).

References

External links
Advanced Fighting Fantasy on the Arion Games website
 Advanced Fighting Fantasy: An Illustrated Bibliography at SFandFantasy.co.uk
Review of Dungeoneer in Games International

British role-playing games
Fantasy role-playing games
Fighting Fantasy
Role-playing games introduced in 1984